From the Heart is a studio album by American country artist Janie Fricke. It was released in November 1979 via Columbia Records and contained ten tracks. It was the third studio release of Fricke's career and spawned two singles that charted on the country surveys in the United States and Canada. This included a cover of "Pass Me By (If You're Only Passing Through)", which was issued as a single in 1980.

Background and content
Janie Fricke was a studio background vocalist who received enough attention in her session work to sign her own recording contract with Columbia Records. The label released a series of Fricke's recordings in the late 1970s that helped her establish a musical identity. Among these releases was 1979's From the Heart. The album was recorded at the Columbia Studio in Nashville, Tennessee in August 1979. Similar to her previous release, the project was produced by Billy Sherrill. From the Heart consisted of ten tracks. The collection included the song "My World Begins and Ends with You", which would later become a top ten country single for the trio Dave & Sugar. It also included a cover of Doris Day's 1952 hit "When I Fall in Love" and Johnny Rodriguez's 1973 country hit "Pass Me By (If You're Only Passing Through)".

Release, reception and singles
From the Heart was released in November 1979 on Columbia Records. It was the third studio album released in Fricke's career and the third with the Columbia label. It was originally offered as a vinyl LP with five selections on both sides of the record. It was also issued overseas in the United Kingdom under CBS Records International. Decades later, the album was re-released to digital and streaming platforms including Apple Music. From the Heart was Fricke's first album to chart in Canada, reaching number ten on the RPM Country Albums list in 1979. The disc would later receive four out of five stars from AllMusic.

Two singles were released from From the Heart. The first was "But Love Me", which was issued on Columbia in October 1979. It spent 13 weeks on the American Billboard Top Country Albums chart before peaking at number 26 in January 1980. The second single released was Fricke's cover of "Pass Me By (If You're Only Passing Through)", which was issued in January 1980. It spent 12 weeks on the Billboard country chart and climbed to number 22 later in the year. "Pass Me By" also reached Canada's RPM Country Singles survey, peaking in the top 20 at number 19.

Track listings

Vinyl version

Digital version

Personnel
All credits are adapted from the liner notes of From the Heart.

Musical personnel

 Phil Baugh – electric guitar
 Ken Bell – acoustic guitar
 Lea Jane Berinati – backing vocals
 Roger Clark – drums
 Nick DiStefano – backing vocals
 Chalmers Davis – keyboards, piano
 Pete Drake – steel guitar
 Jimmy English – electric guitar
 Ralph Ezell – drums

 Janie Fricke – lead vocals, backing vocals
 Johnny Gimble – fiddle
 Owen Hale – drums
 Larry Keith – backing vocals
 The Shelly Kurland Strings – strings
 Jerry Kroon – drums
 Weldon Myrick – steel guitar
 Steve Nathan – keyboards, piano
 Steve Pippin – backing vocals

 Hargus "Pig" Robbins – keyboards, piano
 Marcia Routh – backing vocals
 Billy Sanford – acoustic guitar, guitar
 Henry Strzelecki – bass
 Diane Tidwell – backing vocals
 Jerry Wallace – acoustic guitar
 Pete Wade – acoustic guitar, guitar
 Bob Wray – bass

Technical personnel
 Bill Justis – string arrangements
 Billy Sherrill – producer

Chart performance

Release history

References

1979 albums
Albums produced by Billy Sherrill
Columbia Records albums
Janie Fricke albums